A list of films produced in the Soviet Union in 1933 (see 1933 in film).

1933

See also
1933 in the Soviet Union

External links
 Soviet films of 1933 at the Internet Movie Database

1933
Soviet
Films